The economic policy of the Joe Biden administration, colloquially named Bidenomics, is characterized by relief measures and vaccination efforts to address the COVID-19 pandemic, investments in infrastructure, and strengthening the safety net, funded by tax increases on higher-income individuals and corporations. Other goals include: increasing the national minimum wage and expanding worker training; narrowing income inequality; expanding access to affordable healthcare; and forgiveness of student loan debt. The March 2021 enactment of the American Rescue Plan to provide relief from the economic impact of the COVID-19 pandemic was the first major element of the policy. Biden's Infrastructure Investment and Jobs Act was signed into law in November 2021 and contains about $550 billion in additional investment. His Inflation Reduction Act was enacted in August 2022.

Biden's first year in office saw strong growth in real GDP, wages, employment, and stock market returns, coupled with an increase in inflation.

Overview

2021
President Biden inherited a challenging economic and budgetary situation from President Trump, due significantly to the continuing COVID-19 pandemic.  As of December 2020, the jobs level was nearly 10 million (6%) below the early 2020 peak, and the unemployment rate was an elevated 6.7%. There was a record budget deficit in fiscal year 2020 of $3.1 trillion, or 14.9% GDP.

Biden's first major legislative response was the American Rescue Plan Act enacted in March 2021, a $1.9 trillion package that included $1,400 checks per adult, an expanded child tax credit for a year with $250-300 monthly checks per child expected to drastically reduce child poverty, extended unemployment benefits, and expanded eligibility for healthcare benefits, among others. The primary impact was in fiscal year (FY) 2021, with a smaller impact in FY2022. No Republicans in the House of Representatives or the Senate voted for the Rescue Act.

Biden followed-up with the Infrastructure Investment and Jobs Act, signed into law in November 2021. It authorized infrastructure investment of $1 trillion total over a decade for roads, bridges, airports, sea ports, rail, broadband, water, and public transit, among others. CBO estimated the deficit impact at $250 billion total, as they considered prior infrastructure investment trends as a baseline for comparison. The law passed the Senate in bi-partisan fashion, 69-30.

Real GDP grew 5.9% during Biden's first year, the fastest rate since 1984. Amid record job creation, the unemployment rate fell at the fastest pace on record during Biden's first year, from 6.4% in January 2021 to 3.9% by December 2021. However, inflation significantly increased in 2021 relative to 2020 in the U.S. and Europe, attributed to factors such as strong consumer demand for goods (empowered by government relief programs), supply restrictions in port capacity and microchips, and lower 2020 prices. Inflation was partially offset by strong wage growth; by one measure, worker wages and benefits increased at the fastest rate in at least 20 years. The administration noted that high inflation was also present in the Eurozone, Canada and the United Kingdom, though economists said the $5 trillion in government stimulus spending in the United States during 2020 and 2021 was disproportionately large compared to that of other countries and was a significant contributor to domestic inflation. Despite the pandemic and inflation challenges, Bloomberg News reported in November 2021 that the S&P 500 stock market return of 37.4% in Biden's first year (measured from election day) was the highest of any modern president. CBO forecast in July 2021 that the budget deficit in fiscal year 2022 (Biden's first budget year) would be $1.2 trillion, versus around $3 trillion in FY2020 and 2021.

2022
During July 2022, The Wall Street Journal reported that "Household finances are as strong as they've been in decades, thanks to money saved during the pandemic, debt paid off over the past decade and a strong job market." As of Q1 2022, households had also accumulated $5 trillion more in deposit, savings and money market accounts than pre-pandemic. However, some measures of consumer sentiment indicated near record low satisfaction with the economy, mainly due to inflation. The unemployment rate in July reached 3.46%, the lowest since April 1969, with robust job creation.

Biden said in May 2022 that "Bringing down the deficit is one way to ease inflationary pressures in an economy." The budget deficit fell by $350 billion in FY 2021. It fell by $1.4 trillion in FY 2022, about 50%, or $1.8 trillion (66%) excluding student loan forgiveness of $425 billion, which CBO had scored as spending but later was blocked by court rulings.

During July 2022, there was much media discussion regarding whether the U.S. had entered a recession, despite a strong labor market with low unemployment and robust job creation. The real (inflation-adjusted) GDP level fell slightly during Q1 and Q2 2022, but then rebounded in Q3 2022 to surpass the previous record level set in Q4 2021. Some countries use two negative quarters as the definition of a recession. However, the National Bureau of Economic Research (NBER) is the organization that declares an economic peak and starting point of recessions in the U.S. They reference six key measures in their analyses. All six measures increased from December 2021 to November 2022, signs of growth rather than recession.

During August 2022, Biden signed into law the CHIPS and Science Act and Inflation Reduction Act.

Concerns regarding inflation resulted in the Federal Reserve raising interest rates significantly during 2022, to slow the economy, specifically the "very strong" labor market. Strong household financial positions, rapid wage growth, low unemployment, and a record ratio of open jobs to unemployed were cited by Fed officials as key inflationary concerns. The December 2022 Fed forecast projected an increase in unemployment from 3.7% in November 2022 to 4.6% by the end of 2023, with the Fed driving unemployment higher through raising interest rates and other measures.

Key Legislation

American Rescue Plan Act

Biden's $1.9 trillion relief package, the American Rescue Plan Act, was signed into law in March 2021. Many observers identified it to be the largest social welfare initiative undertaken by the federal government in decades, and economists predict low income households will benefit the most from the plan. Analysts also predict that the adult poverty rate could be cut by a quarter, and the child poverty rate cut by half as a result of its passage.

The key elements of the Rescue Act include:

$1,400 direct payments to individuals earning up to $75,000 a year;
Extending expanded unemployment benefits through the end of September 2021;
Increased the value and expanded eligibility for the child tax credit; to $3,600 per child under age 6 and $3,000 per child ages 6-17, up from $2,000. An estimated 39 million families with children will receive the additional benefits. Payments are scheduled monthly for July to December 2021, with the remaining six months of benefits due when the tax return is filed for 2021. The credit was changed from non-refundable to refundable, meaning those with low income who previously didn't have sufficient tax liability to receive the credit, will now receive the payment. This is a one-year program, that the administration hopes to make permanent.
$130 billion to primary and secondary schools;
$45 billion in rental, mortgage, and utility assistance;
Billions for small businesses;
$14 billion for a national vaccine program, including preparation of community vaccination centers;
$350 billion to help state, local, and tribal governments bridge budget shortfalls.

The Tax Policy Center reported that the law would cut taxes by an average of $3,000 per household and raise after-tax incomes by an average of 3.8% in 2021, with 70% of the benefit going to lower- and middle-income households. This is in sharp contrast to the Tax Cuts and Jobs Act, in which half of the benefits went to the top 5% highest income households.

Infrastructure Investment and Jobs Act

The Infrastructure Investment and Jobs Act is a key pillar in Biden's American Jobs Plan. It passed the House and Senate and was signed into law on November 15, 2021. While referred to as the $1 trillion infrastructure plan, it includes $550 billion in additional spending beyond previous legislation and was scored by the CBO to add about $250 billion to the deficit over a decade. It includes investments for: Roads and bridges ($110B), power infrastructure ($73B), passenger and freight rail ($66B), broadband ($65B), clean drinking water ($55B), western water storage ($50B), public transit ($39B), Airports ($25B), water & soil purification ($21B), ports ($17B), electric vehicles ($15B) and transportation safety programs ($11B).

CHIPS and Science Act
The CHIPS and Science Act passed the House and Senate with bi-partisan support during July 2022 and was signed into law by Biden on August 9, 2022. Biden said: “America invented the semiconductor. It’s time to bring it home.” The New York Times reported that it is valued at $280 billion and is designed to help strengthen America's manufacturing and technology capabilities, including "$200 billion for scientific research, especially into artificial intelligence, robotics, quantum computing, and a variety of other technologies." 

CNBC reported that it includes $52 billion for U.S. companies producing computer chips, plus additional tax credits to encourage chip manufacturing in the U.S. This was in response to a pandemic-related chip shortage, disrupting auto production and driving up car prices and inflation. Further, most chips are manufactured in Taiwan, which increases the risk of disruption should China intervene there.

The White House issued a press release stating: "The CHIPS and Science Act is exactly what we need to be doing to grow our economy right now. By making more semiconductors in the United States, this bill will increase domestic manufacturing and lower costs for families.  And, it will strengthen our national security by making us less dependent on foreign sources of semiconductors.  This bill includes important guardrails to ensure that companies receiving tax payer dollars invest in America and that union workers are building new manufacturing plants across the country."

Inflation Reduction Act
The Inflation Reduction Act passed the House and Senate using reconciliation along party lines in August 2022. President Biden signed it into law on August 16. Vox reported that key objectives include:
Reduce carbon emissions significantly through climate protection incentives. This includes tax credits and rebates for renewable technologies (e.g., solar, wind and electric vehicles). It uses incentives rather than penalties primarily.
Improve health insurance coverage and affordability, by extending ACA subsidy enhancements scheduled to expire in 2022 by three years through 2025. These helped an estimate 7 million people get free health insurance.
Lower healthcare costs by allowing Medicare to negotiate drug prices for key drugs and cap insulin costs for Medicare patients at $35 per month. This does not apply to private insurance.
Enhance tax enforcement, by investing $80B in the IRS over a decade on systems and personnel. CBO estimates an additional $200B in collections over a decade.
Increase corporate taxes, by implementing a 15% minimum tax applied to accounting income and a 1% tax on stock buybacks. The Act does not directly increase taxes on individuals.

The CBO estimated the Act would reduce the budget deficit by about $100 billion over a decade, or $300 billion if enhanced IRS collections are included. CBO also reported that the Act would have little impact on inflation, as shifting money from corporations to healthcare subsidies would boost the economy approximately as much as the deficit decrease would slow it.

The Tax Policy Center estimated that the bottom 80% tax filers by income would receive a net benefit, if ACA premium tax credits (subsidies) are included. The 80th-99th percentile would incur a small cost (0-0.1% increase in average federal tax rate) while the top 1% would incur a 0.2% increase. The costs mainly are imposed indirectly as corporations facing higher taxes may reduce the wage increases or levels for workers; individual tax rates were not changed.

Statistical summary

First year: January 2021 to January 2022

January 2021 to Latest Period

Note 1: Budget deficit in fiscal year 2022 is $950 billion excluding $425 billion in student loan forgiveness which CBO scored as spending initially but has been blocked by courts as of December 2022. This makes the deficit reduction $1,826 billion or 66%.

Plans and legislative strategies

American Jobs Plan

In March 2021, Biden proposed a $2.65 trillion infrastructure package known as the American Jobs Plan with investments over 10 years, fully paid for by corporate tax increases over 15 years. A White House fact sheet described the plan: "This is the moment to reimagine and rebuild a new economy. The American Jobs Plan is an investment in America that will create millions of good jobs, rebuild our country's infrastructure, and position the United States to out-compete China." The fact sheet further described the U.S. as ranking 13th in the world in infrastructure, with a vulnerable electrical grid. It expands the concept of infrastructure from physical assets like roads and bridges, to human infrastructure investments like caregiving and training.

The Committee for a Responsible Federal Budget (CRFB) summarized the investments as follows ($ in billions):
Climate $782 
Transportation $447
Health & Childcare $443
Housing & Buildings $258
Jobs & economic development $196
Research & Development $159
Manufacturing $154
Clean water $111
Broadband $100

CRFB also summarized the revenue elements over 15 years:
Increase corporate tax rate from 21% to 28%, generating $1,300 billion in revenue. The rate had been lowered from 35% in 2017 to 21% in 2018 by the Tax Cuts and Jobs Act.
Implement a global minimum tax, raising $750 billion.
Several other elements to address corporate tax loopholes and shelters, raising $680 billion.

American Families Plan

In April 2021, Biden proposed "The American Families Plan", which a White House fact sheet described as: "[A]n investment in our children and our families—helping families cover the basic expenses that so many struggle with now, lowering health insurance premiums, and continuing the American Rescue Plan's historic reductions in child poverty." The plan elements include: 
Adding at least four years of free education, including two years of pre-school for 3-4 year-olds, and two years of community college. The Biden Administration estimates the pre-school program will benefit 5 million children each year and save the average family $13,000. The community college program will help about 5.5 million students per year pay $0 in fees, about $109 billion over a decade.
Providing child care subsidies to limit spending of low- and middle-income families to 7% of income.
Creating national paid family and medical leave program, comparable to other developed nations.
Expanding food assistance, including in schools to reduce child hunger.
Extending tax cuts in the American Rescue plan indefinitely, including the Child Tax Credit, Earned Income Tax Credit, and the Dependent Care Tax Credit.
Expanding healthcare subsidies in the American Rescue plan indefinitely, including $50/month subsidies (on average) received by nine million people.

The New York Times estimated the American Families Plan would invest about $1.8 trillion over 10 years, with about $800 billion in tax credits, $545 billion in child and family support, $511 billion for education, and $80 billion to expand the ability of the Internal Revenue Service to collect taxes from the wealthy.

Build Back Better Act

The Build Back Better Act, a reconciliation package including about $2.2 trillion in spending/investments and $2.0 trillion in additional revenue over a decade, passed the House of Representatives November 19, 2021 and is pending before the Senate. Most of the bill's provisions have finite duration.

The New York Times reported that enacting the bill would fund benefits such as:
Child care program for children up to five years of age, capping family expenses at 7% of income ($273 billion).
Paid family and medical leave of four weeks ($205 billion).
Child tax credit extension through 2023 ($185 billion).
Universal preschool for 3- and 4-year-olds ($109 billion).
Healthcare programs, such as funds for home health care under Medicaid ($150 billion), and expansion to ACA eligibility and subsidies ($74 billion).
Climate programs with various tax incentives, pollution controls, and financial assistance ($495 billion).
Housing programs such as public housing, rental assistance, and affordable housing ($166 billion).

The revenue or cost reduction sources include:
Corporate tax increases of $814 billion, including new methods such as an alternative minimum tax on accounting profits and taxing stock buybacks.
Individual tax increases of $655 billion, focused on high-income households, including surtaxes for incomes over $10 million or $25 million.
Allowing government to negotiate prices for Medicare prescriptions (cost reduction of $76 billion).
Limiting prescription drug price increases (cost reduction of $84 billion).

The CBO estimated the bill would add $350 billion total to the national debt over the 2022-2031 period, excluding about $200 billion in estimated collections from stronger IRS enforcement (bringing the net impact closer to $150 billion), overall a relatively minor net impact on the national debt.

Biden's first budget FY 2022
President Biden published his first budget for fiscal year 2022, covering the FY2022-2031 decade. The Committee for a Responsible Federal Budget (CRFB) summarized it as follows: "The President's budget proposes about $5 trillion of new spending and tax breaks, reflecting the previously proposed American Jobs Plan, American Families Plan, and nondefense discretionary spending increases. These provisions would be partially offset with nearly $3.6 trillion of new revenue and over $200 billion of budget cuts and savings. The budget would also add $163 billion of interest costs.” CRFB estimated this as a net $1.354 trillion increase in the budget deficit over a decade, or $135 billion/year. This budget is incremental to the $2.0 trillion impact of the American Rescue Plan, which was enacted in March 2021 and already included in the baseline forecast used for the CRFB computations. For scale, Trump's Tax Cuts and Jobs Act represented about $2 trillion in deficit additions over a decade, or $200 billion/year.

CRFB also commented on the economic assumptions in the budget as being comparable to other major forecasts: "The budget's growth assumptions of 2.2 percent per year over the decade and 1.9 percent per year in the second half of the decade are somewhat higher than CBO's projections of 2.0 and 1.6 percent and the Federal Reserve's 2.0 and 1.8 percent estimates. However, they are in line with the Blue Chip consensus, which is also 2.2 percent per year over the next decade and 1.9 percent per year in the longer term." CRFB commented that Biden's budget is somewhat more optimistic on unemployment rates than these other forecasters.

COVID-19

January 2021
On January 22, President Biden issued an executive order intended to deliver economic relief to families and businesses. This included:
Increasing access to food for students missing meals due to school closures and enhancing SNAP (food stamps) benefits;
Improving delivery of direct stimulus payments;
Request Department of Labor to clarify that workers can still access unemployment insurance if employment would have jeopardized their health due to COVID-19;
Develop support network to help families and businesses access government benefits; and
Require federal contractors to pay $15 minimum wage.

Minimum wage

Biden's COVID-19 stimulus package, the American Rescue Plan, originally included raising the minimum wage to $15 per hour, but this was later removed after moderate Senate Democrats and Republicans objected to the proposal. A CBO study in 2019 estimated that raising the minimum wage to $15 by 2025 would increase wages for 17 million directly in that year, although the number of persons with jobs could be reduced in a range of zero to 3.7 million.

Three months into office, Biden signed an executive order to increase the minimum wage for federal contractors by nearly 37%, to $15 per hour. The order went into effect for 390,000 workers in January 2022.

Trade
The Wall Street Journal reported that instead of negotiating access to Chinese markets for large American financial-service firms and pharmaceutical companies, the Biden administration may focus on trade policies that boost exports or domestic jobs. U.S. Trade Representative Katherine Tai said the administration wants a "worker-centered trade policy". U.S. Secretary of Commerce Gina Raimondo said she planned to aggressively enforce trade rules to combat unfair practices by China.

In March 2021, Katherine Tai said that the U.S. would not lift tariffs on Chinese imports in the near future, despite lobbying efforts from "free traders" including former Secretary of Treasury Hank Paulson and the Business Roundtable, a big-business group, that pressed for tariff repeal.

At the October 2021 G20 Rome summit, the Biden administration and the European Union reached agreement to roll back the steel and aluminum tariff regime that had been imposed by the Trump administration in 2018. The agreement retained some protection for American steel and aluminum producers by adopting a tariff-rate quota regime. It also ended retaliatory tariffs on American goods the EU had imposed and canceled a scheduled tariff increase by the EU.

China failed by a wide margin to purchase American goods and services as agreed under the January 2020 Phase One trade deal, which expired on December 31, 2021. The Biden administration  continued to formulate its China trade policy and faced a decision as to whether to reinstate some tariffs and risk retaliation, or to ignore China's breach amid elevated inflation that might be exacerbated by additional tariffs.

Education
Biden has proposed paying for college tuition and pre-K for middle-class families. He also wants to forgive some or all of student loans.

Student loan forgiveness

Biden supported canceling student loan debt up to $10,000 during 2020, for some borrowers. Other prominent Democrats (Senators Warren and Schumer) co-authored a resolution including cancelations up to $50,000 for all borrowers. There is an active debate about whether legislation or executive order is sufficient to cancel student loans. Critics argued that canceling student loans is regressive rather than progressive, as most with student loans are college educated and earn more. Further, the impact on college tuition pricing and access is unclear.

The Federal Reserve Bank of New York reported that student loans totaled $1.5 trillion in 2019, with 43 million borrowers. The average balance was $33,500. About 14 million borrowers (33%) had balances below $10,000; 20 million (47%) had balances $10,000-$50,000, and 9 million (20%) had balances over $50,000.

The Committee for a Responsible Federal Budget reported in November 2020 that canceling student loans had several pros and cons, but was a relatively ineffective economic stimulus. While household net worth would rise by $1.5 trillion if all loans were canceled, in terms of monthly spending the typical household with student loan debt would be avoiding a $200–300 monthly payment. Re-directing this savings to other spending would have limited economic impact of about $100 billion/year. One important consideration is the tax treatment of the forgiven debt; if treated as a gain (income), it would likely be taxable in the absence of legislation negating the gain, offsetting the small positive economic impact.

CNBC reported that forgiving $10,000 in student debt for all borrowers would cost the government $377 billion, but forgiving $10,000 just for those with debt below $10,000 (about a third of borrowers) would cost $75 billion. Debtors in the latter category tend to be those struggling to pay off their debt.

By the end of Biden's first year in office, the Department of Education had forgiven $15 billion in debt for 675,000 borrowers.

Healthcare
Biden has proposed lowering the Medicare age from 65 to 60, and expanding the Affordable Care Act subsidies and eligibility. Some 23 million persons age 60-64 who could directly benefit, either by paying lower insurance premiums or no longer needing to obtain their insurance through an employer. There are about 1.7 million in the 60-64 age range who are uninsured, and 3.2 million who buy coverage because they are not covered by an employer. Hospitals would receive lower reimbursement rates for age 60-64 patients that enroll in Medicare. This plan would also increase the budget deficit, although the CBO has not officially scored the proposal as of January 2021. Lowering the Medicare age is popular, with one poll indicating 85% of Democrats and 69% of Republicans support lowering the eligibility age to as young as 50.

Cryptocurrency 

In January 2021, Biden suspended any federal regulatory proposal related to cryptocurrency until they can be reviewed by the new administration. This change was part of a freeze for all last-minute regulations put in place by the Trump administration. On November 23, U.S. Senator Sherrod Brown (D–OH), Chairman of the U.S. Senate Committee on Banking, Housing, and Urban Affairs, sent a letter to Tether issuer Bitfinex requesting information about company operations due to concerns that the company was engaged in fraud. On March 9, 2022, Biden issued Executive Order 14067 to federal departments and agencies to assess the benefits and risks of cryptocurrencies, and directed the Federal Reserve to continue its research, development, and assessment efforts for a central bank digital currency (CBDC) for the U.S. dollar. On June 6, the U.S. Office of Government Ethics issued a directive barring federal employees from working on any regulation that could influence the value of digital currencies that they hold. When Voyager Digital filed for Chapter 11 bankruptcy protection on July 6, the Federal Deposit Insurance Corporation (FDIC) began investigating marketing claims made by Voyager that its customer dollar deposit accounts were insured by the agency.

CFTC

On January 3, 2022, the Commodity Futures Trading Commission (CFTC) issued an order requiring Blockratize, Inc. pay a $1.4 million fine for failing to register as a swap execution facility, for offering illegal binary option contracts using cryptocurrency on its prediction market website Polymarket, and to close betting markets in violation of the Commodity Exchange Act. On February 9, CFTC Chairman Rostin Behnam asked the 117th U.S. Congress for the authority to regulate certain cryptocurrencies in testimony before the U.S. Senate Committee on Agriculture, Nutrition, and Forestry. On June 2, the CFTC filed a lawsuit against Gemini alleging that the executive staff of the cryptocurrency exchange made false and misleading statements and omissions in communications with regulators about market manipulation of a bitcoin futures contract the company proposed offering in 2017.

On June 7, U.S. Senators Kirsten Gillibrand (D–NY) and Cynthia Lummis (R–WY) introduced a bill to create a regulatory framework for cryptocurrencies that would treat most digital assets as commodities subject to oversight from the CFTC and would not have cryptocurrencies subject to oversight from the SEC unless a cryptocurrency's holders were entitled to the same privileges as corporate investors. On June 8, Behnam announced support for the bill. At a conference hosted by The Wall Street Journal on June 14, U.S. Securities and Exchange Commission (SEC) Chairman Gary Gensler expressed concern that the Lummis-Gillibrand bill could inadvertently undermine stock market and mutual fund protections, noted that cryptocurrency companies were already engaging in behaviors overseen by the SEC, and argued that some digital assets are securities necessitating oversight from the SEC rather than commodities (even if the overwhelming majority of tokens offered by cryptocurrency exchanges are commodities).

Federal Reserve

At a conference held by the Bank for International Settlements on March 22, 2021, Federal Reserve Chairman Jerome Powell stated that the Federal Reserve would not issue a central bank digital currency (CBDC) without explicit congressional authorization. On April 28, Powell stated in a press conference following a Federal Open Market Committee (FOMC) policy meeting that the CBDC system that exists in China could not exist in the United States due to privacy concerns. On May 20, Powell issued a press statement announcing that the Board of Governors would release a white paper on a CBDC for the U.S. dollar. On July 14, Powell testified before the U.S. House Financial Services Committee about CBDC, stated that the white paper on creating a CBDC for the U.S. dollar would be released in a few months, and that stablecoins and cryptocurrencies would not be needed if there was a CBDC for the U.S. dollar. At a press conference following an FOMC policy meeting on September 22, Powell stated that the Federal Reserve was continuing work on the white paper. On October 14, United Wholesale Mortgage announced that it would cease a company pilot to accept mortgage loan repayments in bitcoin.

On January 18, 2022, U.S. Representative Tom Emmer (GOP; MN-6) introduced a bill (HR 6415) to prohibit Federal Reserve Banks from issuing a CBDC. On January 20, the Federal Reserve released its CBDC white paper with a 120-day public comment window. On February 18, Federal Reserve Vice Chair Lael Brainard gave a speech arguing in favor of a CBDC at a University of Chicago Booth School of Business forum on monetary policy in the United States. On May 19, House Republican Conference members on the Financial Services Committee sent a letter to Powell expressing concerns about CBDC and its potential effects on monetary policy and privacy rights. On May 26, Brainard testified before the House Financial Services Committee in favor of a CBDC and argued that it could exist alongside stablecoins. At a conference on the role of the U.S. dollar in the international economy hosted by the Federal Reserve Bank of New York on June 17, Powell noted in an opening statement that the public comment window for the Federal Reserve CBDC white paper was still open. On June 22, the office of U.S. Representative Jim Himes (DEM; CT-4) released a white paper supporting a CBDC. On July 8, Brainard called for greater regulation of cryptocurrencies before the industry's size threatens the financial system.

Justice and Homeland Security Departments

On March 5, 2021, McAfee Corp. founder John McAfee was indicted in the Southern New York U.S. District Court for promoting a cryptocurrency pump-and-dump scheme on his Twitter account that he made $23 million from (after being indicted by the Justice Department for tax evasion on money earned from the scheme and sued by the SEC for promoting the scheme the previous October). On May 13, Binance was reportedly under investigation by the U.S. Justice Department and the Internal Revenue Service for usage by users for money laundering and tax evasion. On February 8, 2022, the U.S. Justice Department arrested businessman Ilya Lichtenstein and rapper Heather R. Morgan for attempting to launder and seized $3.6 billion of the $4.5 billion worth of bitcoin allegedly stolen in the 2016 Bitfinex hack, while the U.S. Justice Department immediately filed a request with District of Columbia U.S. District Court Chief Judge Beryl A. Howell to reverse the bail decision made by Southern New York U.S. District Court Magistrate Judge Debra C. Freeman for Lichtenstein and Morgan due to flight risk concerns (with Lictenstein being jailed and Morgan remaining under house arrest with ankle bracelet monitoring instead of allowing both to go free on $5 million and $3 million bail respectively).

On February 24, BitMEX founders Arthur Hayes and Ben Delo plead guilty to charges of violating the anti-money laundering provisions of the Bank Secrecy Act and each agreed to pay a $10 million fine (after the company agreed to pay a $100 million fine in a settlement with the CFTC the previous August). On March 8, the owners and operators of the cryptocurrency companies EmpowerCoin, ECoinPlus, and Jet-Coin were indicted in the Eastern New York U.S. District Court for conspiracy to commit wire fraud and money laundering and for defrauding investors of $40 million. On March 18, the Southern New York U.S. District Court (with Senior Judge P. Kevin Castel presiding) convicted the operator of the World Sports Alliance, a cryptocurrency scam that offered a token called IGObit and claimed to be affiliated with the United Nations, of defrauding 60 investors of hundreds of thousands of dollars. On March 24, the U.S. Justice Department charged two operators of a $1.1 million non-fungible token rug pull called "Frosties" with conspiracy to commit wire fraud and money laundering. On April 25, Alliance of American Football and former Minnesota Vikings minority owner Reggie Fowler plead guilty to charges of bank fraud in a $600 million crypto scheme.

On May 6, the U.S. Justice Department charged the CEO of Mining Capital Coin with operating a fraudulent $62 million crypto scheme. On the same day, FTX CEO Sam Bankman-Fried defined an industry practice known as "yield farming" in an interview with Bloomberg News journalists Matt Levine, Joe Weisenthal, and Tracy Alloway that Levine and Weisenthal stated met the definition of a Ponzi scheme. On May 12, the CEO of EminiFX was charged by the Federal Bureau of Investigation with operating a fraudulent $59 million crypto scheme in Southern New York U.S. District Court. On June 1, a former product manager at OpenSea, a non-fungible token marketplace, was arrested by the Southern New York U.S. Attorney's Office on charges of wire fraud and money laundering in connection with an insider trading scheme that he was dismissed by the company for the previous September. On June 3, the Federal Trade Commission issued a report showing that approximately 46,000 investors lost more than $1 billion in cryptocurrency scams from January 2021 through March 2022 (with $329 million dollars in the first quarter of 2022).

On June 6, Reuters reported that Binance had facilitated $2.35 billion in money laundering from 2017 to 2021. On June 29, a Freedom of Information Act request stated that Coinbase had shared blockchain technology for investigating financial crimes with U.S. Immigration and Customs Enforcement. On June 30, the U.S. Justice Department filed securities fraud charges against the leaders of EmpiresX, a more than $100 million cryptocurrency exchange Ponzi scheme. On the same day, the Federal Bureau of Investigation (FBI) added Ruja Ignatova to its Ten Most Wanted Fugitives List for the $4 billion OneCoin Ponzi scheme. On July 19, the FBI issued a public warning that stated that fraudulent cryptocurrency mobile phone applications had defrauded 244 investors of $42 million since the previous October. On July 21, three former Coinbase employees were indicted in the Southern New York U.S. District Court for an alleged insider trading scheme involving $1.5 million worth of cryptocurrency assets listed on the exchange, while the SEC filed an insider trading lawsuit against the same employees in the Western Washington U.S. District Court.

Treasury and Labor Departments

During Janet Yellen's confirmation hearing for Secretary of the Treasury, U.S. Senator Maggie Hassan (D-NH) asked about the use of cryptocurrency by terrorists and other criminals. "Cryptocurrencies are a particular concern," Yellen responded. "I think many are used—at least in a transactions sense—mainly for illicit financing." She said she wanted to "examine ways in which we can curtail their use and make sure that [money laundering] doesn't occur through those channels." On May 13, 2021, Binance was reportedly under investigation by the U.S. Justice Department and the Internal Revenue Service (IRS) for usage by users for money laundering and tax evasion. On August 4, IRS officials stated that the agency had seized $1.2 billion worth of bitcoin during fiscal year 2021.

On August 6, the Biden administration released a press statement announcing support for the cryptocurrency tax reporting amendment to the Infrastructure Investment and Jobs Act proposed by U.S. Senators Rob Portman (R–OH), Kyrsten Sinema (D–AZ), and Mark Warner (D–VA) rather than the amendment proposed by U.S. Senators Cynthia Lummis (R–WY), Pat Toomey (R–PA), and Ron Wyden (D–OR). On August 9, a compromise amendment proposed by Toomey, Warner, Lummis, Sinema, and Portman (No. 2656) failed to pass on a unanimous consent vote called by Toomey when Senator Richard Shelby (R–AL) objected to the amendment if it did not include a defense infrastructure spending amendment he introduced (No. 2535), which Toomey agreed to but Senators Bernie Sanders (I–VT) and Tom Carper (D–DE) objected to.

On November 15, President Biden signed the Infrastructure Investment and Jobs Act into law with the original language in the bill related to cryptocurrency tax reporting and definition of cryptocurrency brokers. On March 10, 2022, the Employee Benefits Security Administration of the U.S. Labor Department issued a compliance assistance release warning financial services companies against including cryptocurrencies in 401(k)s and other retirement plans and to use extreme caution if doing so. On April 20, the U.S. Treasury Department sanctioned Russian bitcoin miners as the 2022 Russian invasion of Ukraine entered its third month. On May 6, the Treasury Department sanctioned Blender.io, a cryptocurrency mixer, from the U.S. financial system due to its usage by the Lazarus Group (a cybercrime organization operated by the North Korean government) to launder $20.5 million of cryptocurrency associated with Axie Infinity.

Unions
On January 22, 2021, Biden issued Executive Order 14003 that removed Schedule F, overturning a number of Trump's policies that limited the collective bargaining power of federal unions.  He called on Amazon workers to vote for union representation in a closely watched election in Alabama. This was stronger support than any president has given unions in decades. However the workers defeated the proposal 71% to 29%, enhancing Amazon's reputation as a leading bulwark against unionization. Labor activists said Biden's advocacy would build his support in the working class, fighting off Republican inroads there.

Taxation and deficits

Individual taxes
Biden has pledged to raise taxes only on individual persons earning over $200,000, or $400,000 for married couples filing jointly. Treasury Secretary nominee Janet Yellen reiterated Biden's pledge in her answers during her Senate confirmation hearing process in January 2021. The individual tax cuts in President Trump's Tax Cuts and Jobs Act are scheduled to expire after 2025, for all income levels. This means they automatically revert to the higher rates of the Obama Administration, in the absence of new legislation.

Corporate taxes
Biden has proposed raising the corporate tax rate from 21% to 28%. This rate was lowered by the Republican's 2017 Tax Cuts and Jobs Act from 35% to 21%, so Biden's proposal represents a partial reversal. The 21% tax rate does not expire, in contrast to the individual rates, so legislation would be required to raise it.

International taxation
Finance officials from 130 countries agreed on July 1, 2021 to plans for a new international taxation policy. All the major economies agreed to pass national laws that would require corporations to pay at least 15% income tax in the countries they operate.  This new policy would end the practice of locating world headquarters in small countries with very low taxation rates.  Governments hope to recoup some of the lost revenue, estimated at $100 billion to $240 billion each year.  The new system was promoted by the Biden Administration and the Organization for Economic Cooperation and Development (OECD).  Secretary-General Mathias Cormann of the OECD said, "This historic package will ensure that large multinational companies pay their fair share of tax everywhere."

Budget deficit
The first year that President Biden budgeted is fiscal 2022, which runs from October 1, 2021 to September 30, 2022. CBO forecast in July 2021 that the budget deficit in fiscal year 2022 will be $1.2 trillion, or 4.7% GDP. This is a significant reduction to the budget deficits of $3.1 trillion (15.0% GDP) in FY2020 and $2.8 trillion (12.4% GDP) in FY2021, the last two fiscal years budgeted by President Trump. Those two record annual budget deficits were unusually high, primarily due to response measures to the Coronavirus pandemic.

During February 2021, the CBO forecast budget deficits for 2021-2031, based on legislation in effect as of January 12, 2021, prior to the American Rescue Plan Act (ARPA). This represents the deficit trajectory inherited by Biden; the deficit impact of his policies may be measured against that baseline. CBO later published a baseline including the impact of ARPA. OMB then published its forecast for Biden's fiscal 2022 budget, which includes ARPA plus Biden's American Jobs Plan and American Families Plan. These amounts are shown in the following table:

Deficits in fiscal 2021 and 2022 will be significantly increased by ARPA, although the impact falls thereafter. The budget deficit is expected to fall mid-decade as pandemic-related spending fades and the economy returns to normal. Thereafter, deficits rise due to the long-term trends of an aging country (e.g., fewer workers per retiree) and healthcare costs rising faster than GDP growth.

Theoretical economic perspectives
In terms of theoretical economic perspectives, Bidenomics stands in striking contrast to the previously dominant economic model, known globally as the Washington consensus, or (among its opponents) as neoliberalism.  Milton Friedman was the intellectual godfather, with a base in the Chicago school of economics. It was the dominant economic policy of Western nations from Ronald Reagan in the United States in the 1980s. through the presidencies of  Bill Clinton,  George W. Bush, and  Barack Obama, as well as the British leaders Margaret Thatcher, Tony Blair and David Cameron.  

According to Greg Ip of the Wall Street Journal, "Bidenomics Seeks to Remake the Economic Consensus: Declaring end to neoliberalism, new thinkers play down constraints of deficits, inflation and incentives"
Bidenomics draws on an even older economic heritage going back to John Maynard Keynes in the 1930s, and including Americans Walter Heller, James Tobin, and Arthur Okun in the 1960s. Versions of Keynesianism were the dominant American and British economic theory before the 1970s. Politically, liberals and Democrats have leaned toward Keynes; Republicans and conservatives favor the Chicago School.

Macroeconomics
The old view is that the economy is built around scarcity, because the demand for labor and capital and everything else is unlimited. To achieve full employment and faster growth, more work is needed and more incentives to work. Monetary and fiscal policy is seldom needed, since the market system naturally produces optimum results. Bidenomics argues that not scarcity but slack is the main problem. The market system is typically stuck below optimal levels.  Full employment and growth is held back by a lack of demand, and needs the stimulation of aggressive fiscal policies such as deficit spending, as well as monetary policies to keep cash flowing.

Budget deficits
The traditional view warned against budget deficits in time of prosperity, because the pool of savings is limited. Government deficits use cash that otherwise would be invested in the private sector, and the competition between the Treasury and corporations drives up interest rates. Bidenomics holds that the developed world is awash in surplus savings, which has produced very low interest rates. Absorbing some of this huge pool of savings through large deficits will not divert private investments, and will not raise interest rates. As for tax rates, the very low interest rates makes covering the national debt much easier.

Welfare state
The old view said the welfare state is a necessary evil, and should be focused on people without other resources, such as the elderly.  Unemployment insurance is allowed because it covered by payroll taxes on workers who are employed, but it should be limited so that no one is tempted to turn down a job offer. The argument is that work, no matter how poorly paid, confers dignity. Bidenomics says the government should be promoting the national welfare, and a critical ingredient in our society is caring for dependents – especially children and elderly parents.  It is a technical flaw in the definition of Gross Domestic Product that unpaid household care is not included, even though it is so important.  The Biden American Rescue Plan that became law in March 2021 includes a greatly expanded child tax credit.

Taxation and globalization 
The old view strongly emphasized the wisdom of lowering income taxes, arguing that high rates discourage work, discourage investment, slow growth, and render the U.S. less competitive in a globalized world. Furthermore the minimum wage reduces employment. The new view is that more danger comes from monopoly power, especially as exerted by the giant high tech companies such as Facebook, Google and Amazon. Taxation, regulation and anti-trust laws should be used to control them. Furthermore the status quo is creating many multi-billionaires, who largely evade taxation. The result is rapidly growing inequality that is politically and socially destabilizing. The old view warns that labor unions where the monopolies to worry about and fight against; Biden has been a strong supporter of labor unions.
The new view cites research to show that people paying higher tax rates do not make less effort, and high minimum wages do not reduce employment. However the minimum wage does pull millions of families out of poverty.  As for globalization, the new view warns that globalization raises total world output by moving American jobs to China and elsewhere. The new view warns against China as a threat to long-term American economic interests. Tariffs, which were strongly opposed in the old view, now become a useful weapon. Regarding China, Bidenomics is somewhat parallel to the Trump administration policy.   Ihe old view called for lowering American tax rates to remain competitive internationally . In April 2021 Biden proposed a different approach . The United States would work with the European Community, Britain, Japan and other friendly nations to form a standardized international minimum income tax. The goal is to stop the globalization process whereby companies relocate headquarters into the international host with the lowest tax.

Unemployment
The traditional view warned that when fiscal policy pushes unemployment below its natural level, inflation rises and interest rates go up. The new view is that fiscal and monetary policy should be used to minimize unemployment as much as possible. The argument is that unemployment does not normally cause inflation, and if it eventually does so the social cost of unemployment is much higher than the social cost of inflation.

See also

 Economic policy of the Donald Trump administration
 Political positions of Joe Biden#Economic issues
 Presidency of Joe Biden
 Inflation

References

External links
 

Policies of Joe Biden

Biden, Joe